Charles Arnold Burgi III (born August 15, 1952, Montclair, New Jersey) is an American drummer. He has performed with many rock bands and musicians, ranging from local New Jersey/New York-area artists to international groups, throughout his prolific career. He is the current drummer for The Billy Joel Band.

Career 
After having performed on several album sessions, Burgi earned a spot with the jazz fusion band, Brand X.  He then experienced early mainstream success with his band, Balance in the early 1980s.  This group also featured Peppy Castro, Bob Kulick, Dennis Feldman and noted arranger and keyboardist Doug Katsaros. The group scored a top-25 hit on the U.S. singles chart with "Breaking Away" in 1981.  Although the song was recorded before Burgi joined the group, he had joined in time to record Balance's follow-up album, In for the Count.

In addition to Brand X, Burgi has played and toured with Al Di Meola, Hall & Oates, Joe Lynn Turner, Rainbow, Blue Öyster Cult, Meat Loaf, Fandango and Enrique Iglesias and has recorded with numerous other artists, including Michael Bolton, Glen Burtnik, Bon Jovi and Diana Ross.

Burgi was a member of the on-stage band in the Twyla Tharp - Billy Joel hit musical Movin' Out during the entire 3½ year run on Broadway.

Recent recordings include Billy Joel's live CD 12 Gardens Live and the 2007 Joel-penned single, "Christmas in Fallujah", exclusive to iTunes. Since November 2005, Chuck has been Joel's drummer, touring extensively, including 12 record breaking shows at New York's Madison Square Garden in 2006, 2008's double night The Last Play at Shea and the October 2008 New York Springsteen/Joel benefit for Barack Obama at the Hammerstein Ballroom. He also appears, with former Rainbow bandmate and bassist, Greg Smith, Danger Danger vocalist Ted Poley, and Trixter guitarist Steve Brown, on the self-titled melodic hard rock-styled "Tokyo Motor Fist" album, released February 24, 2017.

He is the brother of actor Richard Burgi and briefly lived in London while playing with Brand X.

Discography

References

External links
 

1952 births
Living people
People from Montclair, New Jersey
People from West Milford, New Jersey
Musicians from New Jersey
Rainbow (rock band) members
American rock drummers
Neverland Express members
American session musicians
American jazz drummers
American heavy metal drummers
American expatriates in England
20th-century American drummers
American male drummers
American male jazz musicians
Brand X members
Billy Joel Band members